Michal Pivoňka (born January 28, 1966) is a Czech former National Hockey League player.  He played his entire NHL career with the Washington Capitals. Selected by the Capitals in the 1984 NHL Entry Draft, Pivonka defected to the United States during the summer of 1986.  Since Eastern Europe was still under the Iron Curtain, it was still difficult for younger hockey players from the Eastern Bloc to play in the NHL.

During his NHL career, Pivonka played in 825 games, scored 181 goals and had 418 assists for a total of 599 points, twice leading the Capitals in scoring; 1991–92 (23G, 57A, 80P) and 1995–96 (16G, 65A, 81P). Pivonka last played in the NHL during the 1998-99 season, before finally retiring from hockey in 2000 after several injury-filled seasons. He has the third most assists in Capitals history with 418, trailing only Nicklas Backstrom and Alexander Ovechkin.

Career statistics

Regular season and playoffs

International

Awards and honors
Directorate Award (Best Forward) and All-Star Selection, 1985 IIHF world junior hockey championships

References

External links
 Profile at hockeydraftcentral.com
 

1966 births
Baltimore Skipjacks players
Czech ice hockey centres
Czechoslovak defectors
Czechoslovak ice hockey centres
Detroit Vipers players
Kansas City Blades players
Living people
Sportspeople from Kladno
Washington Capitals draft picks
Washington Capitals players
Czechoslovak emigrants to the United States
Czechoslovak expatriate ice hockey people
Czechoslovak expatriate sportspeople in the United States
Czech expatriate ice hockey players in the United States
Czech expatriate sportspeople in Austria
Expatriate ice hockey players in Austria